Versil Eugene Deskin (February 14, 1913 – March 7, 1992) was a professional American football player who played wide receiver for five seasons for the Chicago Cardinals.

1913 births
1992 deaths
People from Monroe County, Iowa
American football wide receivers
Drake Bulldogs football players
Chicago Cardinals players